Haitang Subdistrict is a subdistrict in Shizhong District of Leshan, Sichuan, China. , it administers the following 17 residential communities:
Yanwu Street Community
Xujiabian Community
Wenchanggong Community
Wanghao'er Community
Shengshui Street Community
Beimenqiao Community
Shiyan'er Community
Qingguoshan Community
Jiaochangba Community
Xianjie Community
Baita Street Community
Banzhuwan Community
Xincun Street Community
Renminxi Road Community
Fujie Community
Guihualou Community
Shuijingchong Community

See also 
 List of township-level divisions of Sichuan

References 

Township-level divisions of Sichuan
Leshan
Subdistricts of the People's Republic of China